Stamping Ground is a contemporary dance choreographed in 1983 by Jiří Kylián to Carlos Chávez's Toccata for Percussion Instruments. It was inspired by the traditional dances of the Aboriginal Australians.

External links
 Dance in New York City website
 Road to the Stamping Ground documentary
 Aspen Santa Fe Ballet – Stamping Ground (Jacob's Pillow Dance Festival 2011)

Ballets by Jiří Kylián
1983 ballet premieres